Novak Djokovic defeated Kei Nishikori in the final, 6–3, 7–5 to win the men's singles tennis title at the 2016 Rogers Cup. It was his record 30th Masters 1000 title and his record 43rd Masters 1000 final. He did not lose a single set in the entire tournament.

Andy Murray was the reigning champion, but did not participate this year, citing fatigue.

Seeds
The top eight seeds receive a bye into the second round.

Draw

Finals

Top half

Section 1

Section 2

Bottom half

Section 3

Section 4

Qualifying

Seeds

Qualifiers

Qualifying draw

First qualifier

Second qualifier

Third qualifier

Fourth qualifier

Fifth qualifier

Sixth qualifier

Seventh qualifier

References

External Links
Main Draw
Qualifying Draw

Rogers Cup - Men's Singles
Men's Singles